Connelly Springs is a town in Burke County, North Carolina, United States. The population was 1,669 at the 2010 census. It is part of the Hickory–Lenoir–Morganton Metropolitan Statistical Area.

History
The first settler on record in the area was William Lewis Connelly, a colonel in the North Carolina militia, for whom the town was named. In 1838, Colonel Connelly built a log home and operated a way station where fresh horses could be made available for the stagecoach line that ran from Salisbury to Asheville. He also took in boarders who were looking to spend a night during a long journey. During this time, a settlement grew up around the way station, which was then known as Happy Home, and a post office was established.

In 1885, the area was found to have a mineral spring, thought to be beneficial in healing a large number of diseases. Mrs. Elmira Connelly opened her spring to others, and before long people were arriving by horse and wagon, and by train, to cart water away in five-gallon demijohns. The popularity of Mrs. Connelly's mineral spring led to the construction of the Connelly Mineral Springs Hotel, a 50-room hotel that was built along the railroad tracks, and near the mineral spring discovered by Mrs. Connelly. As the town grew, it became known as Connelly Springs, and was incorporated as such on May 4, 1920.

Geography
Connelly Springs is located in eastern Burke County at  (35.744515, -81.503738). It is bordered to the west by the town of Rutherford College and to the north by Rhodhiss Lake on the Catawba River. Interstate 40 forms part of the southern boundary of the town and leads east  to Hickory and west  to Morganton. U.S. Route 70 is the main local road through the town.

Demographics

2020 census

As of the 2020 United States census, there were 1,529 people, 727 households, and 473 families residing in the town.

2000 census
As of the census of 2000, there were 1,814 people, 695 households, and 508 families residing in the town. The population density was 505.0 people per square mile (195.1/km2). There were 752 housing units at an average density of 209.4 per square mile (80.9/km2). The racial makeup of the town was 90.08% White, 1.65% African American, 0.11% Native American, 7.39% Asian, 0.28% from other races, and 0.50% from two or more races. Hispanic or Latino of any race were 0.22% of the population.

There were 695 households, out of which 33.7% had children under the age of 18 living with them, 56.8% were married couples living together, 10.6% had a female householder with no husband present, and 26.9% were non-families. 22.9% of all households were made up of individuals, and 7.8% had someone living alone who was 65 years of age or older. The average household size was 2.61 and the average family size was 3.06.

In the town, the population was spread out, with 28.9% under the age of 18, 6.6% from 18 to 24, 31.4% from 25 to 44, 22.5% from 45 to 64, and 10.6% who were 65 years of age or older. The median age was 35 years. For every 100 females, there were 98.5 males. For every 100 females age 18 and over, there were 96.2 males.

The median income for a household in the town was $33,889, and the median income for a family was $39,500. Males had a median income of $28,065 versus $20,608 for females. The per capita income for the town was $14,451. About 9.5% of families and 12.2% of the population were below the poverty line, including 16.9% of those under age 18 and 9.1% of those age 65 or over.

References

External links

Town website

Towns in Burke County, North Carolina
North Carolina populated places on the Catawba River